The 2018 Open Championship was the 147th Open Championship and was held from 19–22 July 2018 at Carnoustie Golf Links in Angus, Scotland. It was the eighth Open Championship to be played at Carnoustie.

Playing conditions were unusual as a result of the heatwave in Scotland which had produced brown, dry and sun-baked fairways and brown rough. The fairways played quickly, enabling several players to hit drives that covered over 400 yards.

Francesco Molinari posted a bogey-free final round of 69 to win his first major championship. Molinari finished two shots ahead of Kevin Kisner, Rory McIlroy, Justin Rose and Xander Schauffele. He became the first Italian player to win a major.

Media
The 2018 Open Championship was the third to be televised domestically by Sky Sports on dedicated channel Sky Sports The Open. In the United States, it was the third Open Championship to be televised by NBC (Golf Channel's parent network).

Venue

The 2018 event was the eighth Open Championship played at the Carnoustie Golf Links. The most recent was in 2007, with Pádraig Harrington winning the first of his two consecutive Open titles.

Course layout
Championship Course

^ the 6th hole was named Long until 2003

Lengths of the course for previous Opens:

 2007: , par 71
 1999: , par 71
 1975: , par 72
 1968: , par 72

 1953: , par 72
 1937: , par 72
 1931: , par 72

Field
The Open Championship field was made up of 156 players, who gained entry through various exemption criteria and qualifying tournaments. The criteria included past Open champions, recent major winners, top ranked players in the world rankings and from the leading world tours, and winners and high finishers from various designated tournaments, including the Open Qualifying Series; the winners of designated amateur events, including The Amateur Championship and U.S. Amateur, also gained exemption provided they remain an amateur. Anyone not qualifying via exemption, and had a handicap of 0.4 or lower, could gain entry through regional and final qualifying events.

The 2018 Open was the final appearance for 1985 champion Sandy Lyle.

Criteria and exemptions
Each player is classified according to the first category in which he qualified, but other categories are shown in parentheses.	

1. The Open Champions aged 60 or under on 22 July 2018

Mark Calcavecchia
Stewart Cink (2)
Darren Clarke (2)
David Duval
Ernie Els (2)
Todd Hamilton
Pádraig Harrington (2)
Zach Johnson (2)
Tom Lehman
Sandy Lyle
Rory McIlroy (2,3,4,5,10)
Phil Mickelson (2,4,15)
Louis Oosthuizen (2,4,15)
Jordan Spieth (2,3,4,8,9,12,15)
Henrik Stenson (2,4,5)
Tiger Woods

Eligible but did not enter: Ian Baker-Finch, Ben Curtis, Justin LeonardPaul Lawrie and John Daly withdrew before the tournament.2. The Open Champions for 2008–2017

3. Top 10 finishers and ties in the 2017 Open Championship

Rafa Cabrera-Bello (4,5)
Branden Grace (4,5,15)
Brooks Koepka (4,8,12,15)
Matt Kuchar (4,12,15)
Marc Leishman (4,12,15)
Li Haotong (4,5)
Alex Norén (4,5,6)
Matthew Southgate

4. Top 50 players in the Official World Golf Ranking (OWGR) for Week 21, 2018

Kiradech Aphibarnrat (5)
Daniel Berger (12,15)
Patrick Cantlay (12)
Paul Casey (12)
Kevin Chappell (12,15)
Jason Day (10,11,12,15)
Bryson DeChambeau
Tony Finau (12)
Ross Fisher (5)
Matt Fitzpatrick (5)
Tommy Fleetwood (5)
Rickie Fowler (12,15)
Sergio García (5,9,12)
Adam Hadwin (12,15)
Brian Harman (12)
Tyrrell Hatton (5)
Charley Hoffman (12,15)
Dustin Johnson (8,12,15)
Kim Si-woo (11,15)
Kevin Kisner (12,15)
Satoshi Kodaira (20)
Alexander Lévy (5)
Hideki Matsuyama (12,15)
Francesco Molinari (5,6)
Pat Perez (12)
Ian Poulter
Jon Rahm (5,12)
Patrick Reed (9,12,15)
Justin Rose (5,12)
Xander Schauffele (12)
Charl Schwartzel (5,15)
Webb Simpson (11,12)
Cameron Smith
Kyle Stanley (12)
Brendan Steele
Justin Thomas (10,12,15)
Bubba Watson (9)
Gary Woodland (12)

5. Top 30 on the 2017 Race to Dubai

Nicolas Colsaerts
Paul Dunne
Dylan Frittelli
Scott Jamieson
Shane Lowry
Thorbjørn Olesen
Thomas Pieters
Jordan Smith
Hideto Tanihara
Peter Uihlein
Lee Westwood
Fabrizio ZanottiBernd Wiesberger did not play due to injury.6. Last three BMW PGA Championship winners

Chris Wood

7. Top 5 players, not already exempt, within the top 20 of the 2018 Race to Dubai through the BMW International Open

Alexander Björk
Jorge Campillo
Matt Wallace

8. Last five U.S. Open winners

Martin Kaymer

9. Last five Masters Tournament winners

Danny Willett

10. Last five PGA Championship winners

Jason Dufner (12)
Jimmy Walker

11. Last three Players Championship winners

12. The 30 qualifiers for the 2017 Tour Championship

Russell Henley
Jhonattan Vegas (15)

13. Top 5 players, not already exempt, within the top 20 of the 2018 FedEx Cup points list through the Travelers Championship

Chesson Hadley
Patton Kizzire
Luke List

14. Winner of the 2017 Open de Argentina

Brady Schnell

15. Playing members of the 2017 Presidents Cup teams

Emiliano Grillo
Anirban Lahiri
Adam Scott

16. Winner of the 2017 Asian Tour Order of Merit

Gavin Green

17. Winner of the 2017 PGA Tour of Australasia Order of Merit

Brett Rumford

18. Winner of the 2017–18 Sunshine Tour Order of Merit

George Coetzee

19. Winner of the 2017 Japan Open

Yuta Ikeda

20. Top 2 on the 2017 Japan Golf Tour Official Money List

Yūsaku Miyazato

21. Top 2, not already exempt, on the 2018 Japan Golf Tour Official Money List through the Japan Golf Tour Championship

Kodai Ichihara
Ryuko Tokimatsu

22. Winner of the 2017 Senior Open Championship

Bernhard Langer

23. Winner of the 2018 Amateur Championship

Jovan Rebula (a)

24. Winner of the 2017 U.S. AmateurDoc Redman forfeited his exemption by turning professional in May 2018.25. Winner of the 2018 European Amateur

Nicolai Højgaard (a)

26. Recipient of the 2017 Mark H. McCormack MedalJoaquín Niemann forfeited his exemption by turning professional in April 2018.27. Winner of the 2017 Asia-Pacific Amateur Championship

Lin Yuxin (a)

Open Qualifying Series
The Open Qualifying Series (OQS) consisted of 11 events from the six major tours and the Korean Tour. Places were available to the leading players (not otherwise exempt) who finish in the top n and ties. In the event of ties, positions went to players ranked highest according to that week's OWGR.

Final Qualifying
The Final Qualifying events were played on 3 July at four courses covering Scotland and the North-West, Central and South-coast regions of England. Three qualifying places were available at each location.

Alternates
To make up the full field of 156, additional places were allocated in ranking order from the Official World Golf Ranking at the time that these places were made available by the Championship Committee.
From the Week 25 (week ending 24 June) Official World Golf Ranking:

Chez Reavie (ranked 53)
An Byeong-hun (56)
Charles Howell III (60)
Kevin Na (63)
Beau Hossler (64)
Ryan Moore (67)

From the Week 27 (week ending 8 July) Official World Golf Ranking:

Andrew Landry (68)
Keegan Bradley (75)

Round summaries
First roundThursday, 19 July 2018 

Kevin Kisner opened with 66 (−5) for a one-shot lead over Tony Finau, Zander Lombard, and Erik van Rooyen. Kisner was one-over after his first five holes before making a 40-foot eagle putt at the 6th. He made another 35-footer for birdie at the following hole, and added three straight birdies on the back-nine.

Finau made eight birdies in his round to join Van Rooyen and Lombard in second place. Defending champion Jordan Spieth was 3-under before playing his final four holes in 4-over, including a double bogey at the 15th. He finished with 72 (+1). Three-time champion Tiger Woods, playing at the Open for the first time since 2015, had two early birdies but made three bogeys on the back-nine to finish even-par.

Second roundFriday, 20 July 2018 

Zach Johnson, the 2015 champion, holed a 30-foot putt at the 18th to post a round of 67 (−4) and tie first round leader Kevin Kisner. Kisner held a two-shot lead playing the 18th, but hit his approach in the burn guarding the green and made double bogey.

Pat Perez, Tommy Fleetwood and Xander Schauffele were a shot behind at five-under. Perez was tied for the lead playing the 18th, but hit into a bunker and made bogey. Fleetwood, runner-up at the U.S. Open after shooting 63 in the final round, shot a bogey-free 65 (−6); Fleetwood owns the course record of 63 at Carnoustie, made at the 2017 Dunhill Links Championship.

Rory McIlroy, the 2014 champion, shot 69 (−2) for a second straight day to join a group two shots out of the lead. Jordan Spieth, one-over after the first round, rebounded with a 4-under 67 to get within three of the lead, while Tiger Woods shot another even-par round.

World No. 1 and 2 Dustin Johnson and Justin Thomas both missed the cut, Johnson making a double bogey at the last while Thomas made three straight double bogeys on the front-nine.	

Amateurs: Locke (+3), Højgaard (+6), Lin (+12), Rebula (+16)

Third roundSaturday, 21 July 2018Defending champion Jordan Spieth shot a six-under 65 to tie Kevin Kisner and Xander Schauffele for the 54-hole lead. Spieth, beginning the third round three off the lead, drove the green on the par-four 1st and made eagle, and then added a birdie on the 4th to tie. At the 10th, he hit his tee shot into the rough but managed to escape with a birdie, and then made another at 11. He birdied the par-5 14th, and then holed a long birdie putt at the par-3 16th.

Schauffele shot a four-under 67 that included six birdies, finishing his round with a long putt at the 18th from just off the back of the green. Kisner, tied for the lead coming into the round, shot a bogey-free 68 (−3).

Francesco Molinari didn't make a bogey while getting six birdies to shoot 65 (−6) and move to three off of the lead.

Tiger Woods began the round six behind but made three straight birdies on holes 9–11, and then briefly tied for the lead after a birdie at 14. He made bogey on the 16th but managed to save par at the last after his tee shot narrowly missed the burn. He finished with a round of 66 (−5) and was four back.

Zach Johnson was tied with Kisner entering the round but made bogey at 11 and double bogey at the 12th, settling for a one-over round of 72 and falling four shots behind. Justin Rose had the round of the day with 64, tying for the lowest round at an Open Championship at Carnoustie.

Final roundSunday, 22 July 2018Summary
Francesco Molinari shot a bogey-free round of 69 (−2) to become the first Italian to win a major championship. Molinari was three shots behind at the start of the round and began with 13 straight pars before a birdie at the par-5 14th. He hit his approach close to the pin at the 18th and converted another birdie to post 8-under. Molinari didn't make a bogey in his last 37 holes.

Tiger Woods, paired with Molinari, made two birdies on the front-nine to take solo possession of the lead. At the 11th, however, he hit his tee shot in the rough and his approach over the green. His chip shot came up short of the green and he failed to get up-and-down, settling for a double bogey. He made another bogey at the 12th, and despite getting a birdie at the par-5 14th after chipping from close to the 4th pin on the double green he finished three shots behind after an even-par 71.

Xander Schauffele was in a three-way tie for the lead at the start of the round but found trouble at the 5th when his approach shot buried in a greenside bunker. That led to a bogey, and he made another bogey at the 6th after hitting into a bunker once again. At the 7th Schauffele hit his tee shot into the rough and failed to get out on his second shot. His third went over the green and he made double bogey. He rebounded with a birdie at the 10th to get back into the lead, and another at the 14th. One shot back of Molinari playing the 17th, Schauffele's approach went well right of the green and he made bogey to finish two behind.

Kevin Kisner was also tied for the lead, but began his round with a double bogey at the 2nd after having to play sideways out of a fairway bunker. He made three more bogeys on the front-nine for a four-over 40. He began the second nine with a birdie at 10, joining a six-way tie for the lead at six-under. A dropped shot at the 12th, however, saw Kisner fall out of the lead and he also finished two behind Molinari.	

Defending champion Jordan Spieth, tied with Kisner and Schauffele at the start of the round, failed to make a birdie on his way to a five-over 76. He made a bogey at the 5th after hitting into a fairway bunker, then had a double bogey at the 6th after taking an unplayable lie from a bush. He made two more bogeys on the back-nine to finish four shots back.	

Rory McIlroy was two-over par after his first eight holes, before birdies at the 9th and 11th. At the 14th he holed a long putt for eagle to tie for the lead at 6-under. But he failed to make another birdie the rest of the round and settled into the four-way tie for second. Justin Rose, who needed a 13-foot birdie at the 18th Friday just to make the cut, eagled the 14th after his approach hit the flag, then birdied the 18th after a close approach to also finish runner-up.

Final leaderboardNote: Top 10 and ties qualify for the 2019 Open Championship; top 4 and ties qualify for the 2019 Masters TournamentScorecardCumulative tournament scores, relative to par''

Notes

References

External links
Carnoustie 2018 (Official site)
Coverage on European Tour's official site
Coverage on the PGA Tour's official site
Coverage on the PGA of America's official site

The Open Championship
Golf tournaments in Scotland
Sport in Angus, Scotland
Open Championship
Open Championship
Open Championship